Randolph Isaiah "Ikey" Owens (December 1, 1974 – October 14, 2014) was an American keyboardist known for his work with The Mars Volta, Jack White and an array of bands from the Long Beach music scene.

Biography 
He notably performed as a member of Long Beach Dub Allstars, but in 1998 it was an encounter with Cedric Bixler-Zavala and Omar Rodríguez-López of At the Drive-In at a concert in Irvine which proved fateful. In 1999 Owens lost his job at a financial management firm in Huntington Beach that "helped handle billion-dollar accounts for Disney and the Catholic Church", but he eventually received an invitation to join the dub reggae band De Facto and found himself touring Europe with Omar, Cedric, and Jeremy Ward. Not long after that he was once again invited to join their new project, The Mars Volta. Since then Owens was notable for being the longest tenured member of the Mars Volta outside Bixler-Zavala and Rodriguez-Lopez, having continually recorded and performed with the band since their 2001 inception, although this came to an end in 2011 when he was not asked by Rodriguez-Lopez to accompany The Mars Volta on their summer tour.  The reasons for this decision are currently unknown, although on July 2 Mars Volta bassist Juan Alderete claimed that Owens was currently "producing bands these days." Juan later noted, "He had some conflicts in his scheduling, and then it all just naturally evolved into what it is today. Ikey is awesome. I miss dinners with him."

Owens was also very active outside the Mars Volta. Beginning in 2002, Owens wrote and recorded solo material under the moniker Free Moral Agents, releasing a vinyl-only EP on Pete Records, as well as a GSL split 12-inch with Subtitle. They released their full-length "Everybody's Favorite Weapon" in 2004. He played with Pocket Lent, Teen Heroes and did session and work and live shows with El-P, Dave Sitek from TV on the Radio, Shuggie Otis, The Aquabats, Blowfly, Barrington Levy, Mastodon, Gravy Train!!!!, Born Jamericans, Wailing Souls, Radioinactive, Heavens, Prefuse 73, Bob Forrest, and poet/spoken word artist Saul Williams. Owens worked with 2Mex as hip hop duo the Look Daggers. In 2007, Ikey produced First You Live by Orange County progressive-folk band Dusty Rhodes and the River Band.
Owens was also seen playing with the Long Beach experimental band Crystal Antlers. Free Moral Agents released their second full-length album Control This in the fall of 2010 (9/28), the first album with the band's expanded line-up.

Owens later became part of Jack White's all-male backup band The Buzzards, playing keyboards, organ and piano. He took part in the world tour in support of White's album Blunderbuss, and later also performed on White's second album, Lazaretto, and was in the middle of the supporting tour of the album at the time of his death.

Death 
On October 14, 2014, Owens was found dead due to a heart attack in his hotel room in Puebla, Mexico, aged 39. Two remaining concerts in Mexico in support of Jack White's album, Lazaretto, were cancelled. The band had played in Mexico City three days earlier, in Puebla one night before the incident, and were scheduled to perform in Guadalajara the day of his death.

Discography

Solo 
Looking for Lauryn Hill In Lakewood as Isaiah Ikey Owens (July 27, 2010, as download on iTunes)

With Free Moral Agents 
Everybody's Favorite Weapon (2004)
The Special 12 Singles Series (2005 as 7-inch vinyl) (October 3, 2006, as download on iTunes [Special Twelve Singles Series])
Momma's Gun Club Vol. 1 (2006 as download on AlphaPup) (February 27, 2007, as download on iTunes)
Looking for Lauryn Hill in Lakewood (May 2007 as download on AlphaPup)
Free Moral Agents 7-inch EP (September 9, 2008, on clear red vinyl, limited to 300 copies)
Free Moral Agents 10-inch single "North Is Red" b/w Tony Allen remix (2009)
Control This formerly The Honey in the Carcass of the Lion (September 28, 2010)

With Look Daggers 
That Look – EP (2006)
The Patience – EP (2007)
Suffer in Style – LP (2008)

With De Facto 
How Do You Dub? You Fight For Dub, You Plug Dub In EP (1999/2001)
456132015 EP (2001)
Megaton Shotblast LP (2001)
Légende du Scorpion à Quatre Queues LP (2001)

With The Mars Volta 
Tremulant – EP (2002)
De-Loused in the Comatorium – LP (2003)
Live – EP (2003)
Frances the Mute – LP (2005)
Scabdates – LP (2005)
Amputechture – LP (2006)
The Bedlam in Goliath – LP (2008)
Octahedron  – LP (2009) – credited but did not actually play on the album

Guest appearances 
Turn the Radio Off – Reel Big Fish (1996)
Forget the World – The Hippos (1997)
Second-hand Smoke – Sublime (1997)
"Audio Satellite" – Teen Heroes (1998)
A Manual Dexterity: Soundtrack Volume 1 – Omar Rodríguez-López (2004)
Saul Williams – Saul Williams (2004)
Shifting Gears – Z-Trip (2005)
Blood Mountain – Mastodon (2006)
Revisions Revisions: The Remixes 2000–2005 – DJ Nobody (2006)
Wednesday: Modern Folk and Blues – Bob Forrest (2006)
Patent Pending – Heavens (2006)
The Moreye – the Visionaries (2006)
Flight of the Bass Delegate – The Jai-Alai Savant (2007)
RoadKillOvercoat – Busdriver (2007)
I'll Sleep When You're Dead – El-P (2007)
The Inevitable Rise and Liberation of NiggyTardust! – Saul Williams (2007)
Imaginary Foe – Reason To Rebel (2009)
Ctrl Alt Delete – Free the Robots(2010)
Cancer 4 Cure  – El-P (2012)
Jack White live in NY – Jack White (2012)
Venus Breakdown EP – Milk+ (2012)
"Creation's Finest" – Mother's Cake (2012)
Band on Wire – Milk+ (2013)
Run The Jewels – Run The Jewels (2013)
Rival Sons – Great Western Valkyrie (2014)
Lazaretto – Jack White (2014)
 Strange Planes of Surveillance – Buzzmutt (2014)Once More 'Round the Sun – Mastodon (2014)Run The Jewels 2 – Run The Jewels (2014)Arañas en La Sombra – Omar Rodríguez-López (2016)Breaking Careless Beds – The Harms "She Turns" EP (2014)When I See You – The Harms "She Turns" EP (2014)<https://theharms.bandcamp.com>

 As producer 
"The Radio Listener Remixes" – Various Artists (1999)
"Hello Doctor" – Gravy Train!!!First You Live – Dusty Rhodes & The River Band (2007)Suffer in Style – Look Daggers (2008)
A Future to Kill the Habits on the Witch's Tongue – Mode 2008
"S/T ep" – Crystal Antlers
"All the Colors" – Greater California 2009
"Control This" – Free Moral Agents 2010
Family E.P' – Wolf Magic 2010
Jeminism II – MIJA 2010
Innermachine – The Terrapin 2011
Houses of Joy – Meladora 2011
Store Bought Roses – Mode 2011
Smile Trials – Chase Frank 2011
She Turns – The Harms 2014
Midnight Makeup – Melvoy 2011
Boyfrndz – Boyfrndz EP 2011
War To Head – Ape Machine 2011
Horizons of Expectation EP – Holophrase 2012
Massa Confusa – Rubedo 2012
"Mary Amygdala" – True Aristocrats (2012)
Mangled by the Machine – Ape Machine 2013
Band on Wire – Milk+ (2013)
Buzzmutt – Strange Planes of Surveillance 2014
Love Is The Answer – Rubedo 2013
Summer High- Various Blonde 2014
SoCal Tennis Pros – MMXV 2014 released on YouTube''
Disfrutalo! - Disfrutalo! 2014
Wheelchair Sports Camp - No Big Deal 2016

References

External links 

1974 births
2014 deaths
African-American rock musicians
Record producers from California
Musicians from Long Beach, California
Grammy Award winners
Progressive rock keyboardists
The Mars Volta members
Long Beach Dub Allstars members
De Facto (band) members
21st-century American keyboardists
21st-century African-American musicians
20th-century African-American people